Siphocampylus humboldtianus is a species of plant in the family Campanulaceae. It is endemic to Ecuador.  Its natural habitat is subtropical or tropical moist montane forests.

References

humboldtianus
Endemic flora of Ecuador
Vulnerable flora of South America
Taxa named by Carl Borivoj Presl
Taxonomy articles created by Polbot